Pegov (Russian: Пегов) is a Russian masculine surname originating from the old Russian word pega, meaning a spot, a birthmark; its feminine counterpart is Pegova. It may refer to the following notable people:

Nikolai Pegov (1905–1991), Soviet official and diplomat
Nina Pegova (born 1994), Russian golfer
Pavel Pegov (born 1956), Russian speed skater 
Semen Pegov (born 1985), Russian journalist

References

Russian-language surnames